Republic is a 2021 Indian Telugu-language political drama film written and directed by Deva Katta, and produced by JB Entertainments and Zee Studios. The film stars Sai Tej, Aishwarya Rajesh, Ramya Krishna, and Jagapathi Babu. The plot follows Panja Abhiram (Tej), an IAS officer who tackles the corruption in the political system and the administrative machinery.

Principal photography of the film began in mid-2020 and ended in February 2021, after being briefly suspended by the COVID-19 pandemic. Mani Sharma scored the film while the cinematography and editing are performed by M. Sukumar and Praveen K. L. respectively. Republic was released theatrically on 1 October 2021 to critical acclaim.

Plot 
In 1970, Telleru Lake is one of the biggest freshwater lakes in India and is a pivotal lake for fishing and farming. For over 40 years, the lake has been built on fishing farms mainly owned by 'Visakha' Vani while simultaneously polluting the lake alongside.

The story shifts to Panja Abhiram, a smart and impious youth from Eluru that likes society to be truthful and honest after experiencing corruption within his own family with his father Panja Dashrath being a corrupt government official, which causes him to dislike his father. With his high scoring in various exams, he gets a seat at MIT. However, due to his father participating in an election rig, he decides to dive more into the political system to change it.

Abhi simultaneously meets Myra Hansen, who is an NRI trying to search for her missing brother Dr. Varun Hansen, who is known to have had an interaction with a local goon named Guna. Meanwhile, founding a new party and making a clean sweep in the election, Vani makes her son Indukuri Vishnu Vardan the next Chief Minister of Andhra Pradesh, gaining the image of kingmaker. Later, Abhi meets Mani, an auto driver, and his father trying to fight for justice against Vani.

Meanwhile, Abhi and Myra come to know that Varun has been found dead, but they do not get any support from the police, leaving it to a dead end. After passing the UPSC exam, Abhi heads to his interview, but after a PTSD episode on the train, he ends up seeing Mani being killed by Guna, who is under Vani's orders. Abhi, after seeing all of this heads, to his interview but ends up not getting selected due to his mentality. However, a few days later, he ends up as a topper in the exam, which became condoned by everyone, including himself. Abhi then finds out that he was selected by the UPSC board as an experiment of implementing him as the supreme authority of the district and that he cannot be interfered with by any politician in the state.

After Abhi starts his job, he sets out to try and find Guna, who has an encounter order against him, and he manages to kill him. However, at the same spot, they find Myra unconscious. Abhi rushes her to the hospital to find that she has been brutally raped and is close to being killed by Guna due to Varun's research. He then enquires about the children to find out that they have died and have still not been found. Abhi, filled with rage, decides to address the media that the system is why things are occurring like this. He gets the video evidence of Varun and finds out about how Varun is a neurological professor and doctor. The story then dives into a flashback on how Varun's wife Radhika dies of a neurological disease that was caused by the fish in Telleru Lake. He then sees more people affected and plans to research what happened and comes to the conclusion that it was contaminated by Vani's fish farms. An enraged Abhi gets his father and the health officer both suspended for faking reports about the lake.

Abhi, with this information, visits Vani to come to an understanding by removing her farms and all the construction on the lake. Vani tries to understand him by telling her journey. He cannot make any change in society; earlier, being a daughter of a socialist, she used to be like him, but during the emergency, she lost her father and husband. Then she understood that no matter how much somebody tries to change the system, it will not change, then she adapted to the system later. However, Vani sides with the fisherman by stating that they will all be stakeholders in her farms and gets them to turn against Abhi.

Abhi, in an attempt to get both sides to go against Vani, calls upon a meeting but ends up being very violent, causing multiple lives to be lost. Regarding these facts, the UPSC board suspends Abhi and starts an inquiry on the issue. Later, Abhi learns that Vani is decided to give support to a central party who are in the government earlier and used to oppose them, then he understands and gets frustrated more for using him as a political tool by a central party to get Vani comes into their alley. However, due to this, his father also gets into trouble with the villagers, causing him to get beat up. Abhi saves his father, and in a flashback, it is known that Dashrath was a very sincere officer, but due to his sincerity, he gets transferred to multiple states, which also causes his wife and daughter to be killed, which ultimately makes him adapt to the system and become corrupt.

Abhi and Dashrath team up and decide to appeal to the court with all of the proper evidence. The High Court Justice Narasimham, inspired by the final hearing of Abhi despite having a lot of pressure from the state and central level politicians, stands for justice and gets Vani, Vijay Kumar, and Dashrath removed from their posts and gives them life sentences. The Supreme Court also orders for all construction from the lake to be demolished at once. With this outcome, Vani becomes hospitalized and tells Abhi that no matter how much he tries, the system will not change.

However, a few days later, Abhi finds construction starting again on the lake and confronts the villagers on why they chose to do it. They state that his caste ruled for 40 years but it is now their turn to rule, but Abhi ultimately ends up gaining support from Mani's father. Soon though, Abhi finds himself at the edge of the forest by Mani's father and his gang and is ultimately killed by them because they want the lake for themselves. Before killing, Mani's father apologizes to Abhi for killing him and for his betrayal (realizes that by entering into the vicious circle to become a new victim in the power game). This also prompts Vani to commit suicide, which realizes that she was concerned about Abhi and appreciates his work and is finally tired of becoming a victim of this vicious political circle. This incident throws the entire two Telugu states into distress. The movie ends off with sincere officers that were killed in a similar way for what they have done for society.

Cast 

 Sai Tej as Collector Panja Abhiram, IAS
 Aishwarya Rajesh as Myra Hansen, an NRI
 Ramya Krishna as 'Visakha' Vani, a corrupt politician
 Jagapathi Babu as Deputy Collector Panja Dashrath, Abhiram's father
 Ravi Raja as CM Indhukuri Vishnu Vardhan
 Subbaraju as Vijay Kumar IAS
 Rahul Ramakrishna as 'Auto' Mani
 Srikanth Iyengar as SP Gopal Rao
 Aamani as Kamala, Abhiram's stepmother
 Surekha Vani as Abhiram's mother
 Sai Dheena as Guna, a goon
 Jayaprakash as Prakash Rao IAS, UPSC Board Secretary 
 Posani Krishna Murali as School Principal
 Manoj Nandam as Sub-Inspector Manoj
 Ravi Varma as Rahul Sengupta
 C. V. L. Narasimha Rao as Justice Narasimham 
 Venkatesh Kakumanu as Abhi's friend 
 Vinay Nallakadi as Jeetu

Production 
The film was launched in early 2020 and filming began in mid-2020. Due to COVID-19 pandemic, the filming was paused and later resumed in December 2020. Nivetha Pethuraj was earlier cast for the film, who was later replaced by Aishwarya Rajesh.  The film's title was announced 25 January 2021. The film was shot for 64 days and completed the shoot in February 2021. Tej started dubbing for his character in June 2021.

Soundtrack

Release 
In early 2021, the makers announced the film would release on 4 June 2021. However, due to the second wave of the COVID-19 pandemic in India, the film's release was postponed. In August 2021, the film's release date was announced to be as 1 October 2021.

Reception 
Calling it "Outstanding," Srinivas Kanchobhotla of Idlebrain.com opined that Republic was not merely a film but a "social treatise about the systemic malaise."

Reviewing the character of Abhiram in the film, Subhash K Jha said, "He is one of the truest heroes I’ve seen in any film in any language in recent times."

Ram Venkat Srikar of Cinema Express called it "well-crafted" and wrote: "Republic is a smart construction on the idea of corruption and how its repercussions seep into the lives of innocents." He added that the writing is strong and coherent. Srikar drew comparisons with Alan J. Pakula's The Parallax View (1974) as in the conflict in both films, encircles a water body and mysterious disappearances.

In his review for the Hindustan Times, Haricharan Pudipeddi said: "Tej is aptly cast, and he gets ample scope and screen time to shine and deliver a strong performance."

Calling it an "intense political drama," Neeshita Nyayapati of The Times of India rated the film 3/5. Nyayapati appreciated the performances writing, "Tej gives the film and the character his all [..] Ramya Krishnan is delicious as the baddie, a woman who will smile in your face even as she plots your fate."

The Hindu critic Sangeetha Devi Dundoo termed it a "gripping political drama doesn’t take an escapist entertainment route." She opined that the film's strength lied in its grey characters.

Appreciating the performances of Tej, Ramya and Aishwarya, Prakash Pecheti of Telangana Today stated: "Republic surely adds a cap in the feather for Sai Dharam Tej."

Reviewing the film for The New Indian Express, Gabbeta Raniith Kumar said that Katta presented Republic as a cautionary tale reminding the audience of the importance of citizen activism, criticism and constant vigilance to protect the sanctity of democracy.

References

External links 
 

Indian political drama films
Films scored by Mani Sharma
Films set in Andhra Pradesh
Films shot in Andhra Pradesh
Films directed by Deva Katta
2021 films
2020s Telugu-language films
2020s political drama films
2021 drama films
Film productions suspended due to the COVID-19 pandemic
Films postponed due to the COVID-19 pandemic
Films about corruption in India
Fictional portrayals of the Andhra Pradesh Police
Indian Administrative Service officers